The Gudava church of Saint Barbara is a medieval church in the village of Second Gudava in Ochamchira District what is now Abkhazia, an entity in the South Caucasus with a disputed political status. It is located near the estuary of the Okumi river in the historical district of Samurzakano in southeastern Abkhazia.

History 
The first church in this location existed in 6-7 century.
The extant monument is a hall church, probably dated to the 15th or 16th-century. A stone plaque found at the church and now preserved in the National Museum of Georgia in Tbilisi, bears the medieval Georgian inscription in an asomtavruli script, making mention of the certain Rabay and his wife, Nugamtsira. The church probably stands on the site of an earlier place of worship, once an episcopal seat, which is mentioned by the medieval Georgian chronicles as Gudaqva, abolished by the early 11th-century monarch Bagrat III of Georgia. This is identified in modern scholarship with the Ziganeos of the Eastern Roman sources, one of the suffragan dioceses of the metropolitan see of Lazica. The remains of a Byzantine cathedral have not been discovered, but a 4th-5th-century rectangular baptistery with a protruding apse as well as remnants of a Roman fortified wall was unearthed in the village by a Georgian archaeological expedition led by Parmen Zakaraia between 1965 and 1972.

References 

Religious buildings and structures in Georgia (country)
Religious buildings and structures in Abkhazia
Churches in Abkhazia